Cousin marriage laws in the United States vary considerably from one state to another, ranging from cousin marriages being legal in some to being a criminal offense in others. However, even in the states where it is legal, the practice is not widespread. (See Incidence.)

Current position 
Several states of the United States prohibit cousin marriage. , 24 U.S. states prohibit marriages between first cousins, 19 U.S. states allow marriages between first cousins, and seven U.S. states allow only some marriages between first cousins. Six states prohibit first-cousin-once-removed marriages. Some states prohibiting cousin marriage recognize cousin marriages performed in other states, but despite occasional claims that this holds true in general, laws also exist that explicitly void all foreign cousin marriages or marriages conducted by state residents out of state.

Summary

Incidence
Data on cousin marriage in the United States is sparse. It was estimated in 1960 that 0.2% of all marriages between Roman Catholics were between first or second cousins, but no more recent nationwide studies have been performed. It is unknown what proportion of that number were first cousins, which is the group facing marriage bans.

While recent studies have cast serious doubt on whether cousin marriage is as dangerous as is popularly assumed, professors Diane B. Paul and Hamish G. Spencer speculate that legal bans persist in part due to "the ease with which a handful of highly motivated activists — or even one individual — can be effective in the decentralized American system, especially when feelings do not run high on the other side of an issue."

History
Cousin marriage was legal in all states before the Civil War. Anthropologist Martin Ottenheimer argues that marriage prohibitions were introduced to maintain the social order, uphold religious morality, and safeguard the creation of fit offspring. Writers such as Noah Webster (1758–1843) and ministers like Philip Milledoler (1775–1852) and Joshua McIlvaine helped lay the groundwork for such viewpoints well before 1860. This led to a gradual shift in concern from affinal unions, like those between a man and his deceased wife's sister, to consanguineous unions. By the 1870s, Lewis Henry Morgan (1818–1881) was writing about "the advantages of marriages between unrelated persons" and the necessity of avoiding "the evils of consanguine marriage", avoidance of which would "increase the vigor of the stock". To many, Morgan included, cousin marriage, and more specifically parallel-cousin marriage was a remnant of a more primitive stage of human social organization. Morgan himself had married his cousin in 1853.

In 1846, Massachusetts Governor George N. Briggs appointed a commission to study mentally handicapped people (termed "idiots") in the state. This study implicated cousin marriage as responsible for idiocy. Within the next two decades, numerous reports (e.g., one from the Kentucky Deaf and Dumb Asylum) appeared with similar conclusions: that cousin marriage sometimes resulted in deafness, blindness, and idiocy. Perhaps most important was the report of physician Samuel Merrifield Bemiss for the American Medical Association, which concluded cousin inbreeding does lead to the "physical and mental deprivation of the offspring". Despite being contradicted by other studies like those of George Darwin and Alan Huth in England and Robert Newman in New York, the report's conclusions were widely accepted.

These developments led to thirteen states and territories passing cousin marriage prohibitions by the 1880s. Though contemporaneous, the eugenics movement did not play much of a direct role in the bans. George Louis Arner in 1908 considered the ban a clumsy and ineffective method of eugenics, which he thought would eventually be replaced by more refined techniques. By the 1920s, the number of bans had doubled. Since that time, Kentucky (1943) and Texas have banned first-cousin marriage and since 1985, Maine has mandated genetic counseling for marrying cousins to minimise risk to any serious health defect to their children. The National Conference of Commissioners on Uniform State Laws unanimously recommended in 1970 that all such laws should be repealed, but no state has dropped its prohibition.

Proposed changes
A bill to repeal the ban on first-cousin marriage in Minnesota was introduced by Phyllis Kahn in 2003, but it died in committee. Republican Minority Leader Marty Seifert criticized the bill in response, saying it would "turn us into a cold Arkansas". According to the University of Minnesota's The Wake, Kahn was aware the bill had little chance of passing but introduced it anyway to draw attention to the issue. She reportedly got the idea after learning that cousin marriage is an acceptable form of marriage among some cultural groups that have a strong presence in Minnesota, namely the Hmong and Somali.

In contrast, Maryland delegates Henry B. Heller and Kumar P. Barve sponsored a bill to ban first-cousin marriages in 2000. It got further than Kahn's bill, passing the House of Delegates by 82 to 46 despite most Republicans voting no, but finally died in the state senate. In response to the 2005 marriage of Pennsylvanian first cousins Eleanor Amrhein and Donald W. Andrews Sr. in Maryland, Heller said that he might resurrect the bill because such marriages are "like playing genetic roulette".

Texas did pass a ban on first-cousin marriage the same year as Amrhein and Andrews married, evidently in reaction to the presence of the polygamous Fundamentalist Church of Jesus Christ of Latter-Day Saints (FLDS). Texas Representative Harvey Hilderbran, whose district includes the main FLDS compound, authored an amendment to a child protection statute to both discourage the FLDS from settling in Texas and to "prevent Texas from succumbing to the practices of taking child brides, incest, welfare abuse, and domestic violence". While Hilderbran stated that he would not have authored a bill solely to ban first-cousin marriage, he also said in an interview, "Cousins don't get married just like siblings don't get married. And when it happens you have a bad result. It's just not the accepted normal thing."

Some news sources then only mentioned the polygamy and child abuse provisions and ignored the cousin marriage portion of the bill, as did some more recent sources. The new statute made sex with an adult first cousin a more serious felony than with adult members of one's immediate family. However, this statute was amended in 2009; while sex with close adult family members (including first cousins) remains a felony, the more serious penalty now attaches to sex with an individual's direct ancestor or descendant.

The U.S. state of Maine allows first-cousin marriage if the couple agrees to have genetic counseling, while North Carolina allows it so long as the applicants for marriage are not rare double first cousins, meaning cousins through both parental lines. In the other 25 states permitting at least some first-cousin marriage, double cousins are not distinguished.

States have various laws regarding marriage between cousins and other close relatives, which involve factors including whether or not the parties to the marriage are half-cousins, double cousins, infertile, over 65, or whether it is a tradition prevalent in a native or ancestry culture, adoption status, in-law, whether or not genetic counselling is required, and whether it is permitted to marry a first cousin once removed.

See also
 Cousin marriage court cases in the United States
 Laws regarding incest in the United States

References

Marriage law in the United States
Lists of United States legislation
States of the United States law-related lists
Marriage law in the United States